Over the Moon is the debut studio album by New Zealand singer-songwriter Ginny Blackmore. It was released on 4 December 2015.

Singles
Five singles from the album have been released so far:

"Bones" (2013)
"Holding You" (2014)
"Love Me Anyway" (2015)
"Hello World" (2015)
"Under My Feet" (2015)

Track listing

Notes
"SFM" was originally released by Christina Aguilera under the title "Sing for Me" on her album Lotus.
"Love Strikes" was originally released by Katharine McPhee on her album Hysteria.

Charts

References

2015 debut albums
Ginny Blackmore albums
Albums produced by Sam de Jong